Clambake is the sixteenth soundtrack album by American singer and musician Elvis Presley, released by RCA Victor in mono and stereo, LPM/LSP 3893, in October 1967. It is the soundtrack to the 1967 film of the same name starring Presley. He entered  RCA Studio B in Nashville, Tennessee on February 21, 1967 for Recording sessions for his twenty fifth film. Supplemental material sessions took place on September 10 and 11, 1967. It peaked at number 40 on the Billboard 200.

Content
By the end of 1966, Presley no longer commanded the same level of sales or artistic respect as he had during the first ten years of his career. But Elvis had little enthusiasm at this juncture for more soundtrack sessions, the project already in jeopardy before it started. The sessions turned out a fiasco; of the eight songs recorded, two had been edited out of the film, and even with "How Can You Lose What You Never Had" restored to the soundtrack, that left an album of merely seven songs.

The album would prove to be a turning point in Presley's career. After many years of churning out forgettable songs for forgettable films, he was clearly past his prime. All realms of popular music had totally bypassed him during the 1960s while he had been "lost in Hollywood". So Presley decided to begin recording music written by accomplished songwriters. A session to record additional material in Hollywood was cancelled in August, rescheduled at RCA Studio B in September. Disregarding publishing control, Presley picked songs that appealed to him personally, including Eddy Arnold's country and western hit of 1956 "You Don't Know Me" and Jimmy Reed's 1960 rhythm and blues hit, "Big Boss Man." Both selections were issued as a single at the end of September before being added to the album, the A-side just barely making the Top 40. Presley also requested a song he had heard on the radio in Los Angeles by Jerry Reed, inviting Reed himself to duplicate the distinctive acoustic guitar part. They rousted Reed from a fishing-trip, who arrived to play on Presley's version of his own composition, "Guitar Man." After it was recorded, Reed refused to turn over the usual publishing percentages to Freddy Bienstock, another assault on the soundtrack formula that had been in place throughout the decade. Five songs were selected from this session to bring the album up to a total of twelve tracks.

Including this LP, of his fifteen albums since Pot Luck with Elvis in 1962, only three had not been film soundtracks: one (Elvis' Golden Records Volume 3) was a compilation of hit singles, another (Elvis for Everyone) a compilation of leftovers from a ten-year span of recording sessions, and the third being a bona fide studio album, the gospel How Great Thou Art. Even with the five recent non-movie songs, including a hit single, Clambake sold less than 200,000 copies, faring worse than its predecessor Double Trouble which had been his lowest-charting album so far.

Reissues
In 2006 Clambake was reissued on the Follow That Dream label in a special edition that contained the original album tracks along with numerous alternate takes.

Track listing

Original release

2006 Follow That Dream reissue

2016 The RCA Albums Collection reissue

Personnel
 Elvis Presley − vocals
 The Jordanaires − backing vocals
 Millie Kirkham − backing vocals
Dolores Edgin − backing vocals
June Page − backing vocals
Priscilla Hubbard − backing vocals
 Boots Randolph − saxophone
 Norm Ray − saxophone
 Pete Drake − pedal steel guitar
 Scotty Moore − rhythm guitar
Chip Young − lead guitar, rhythm guitar on "Guitar Man" and "Big Boss Man"
 Jerry Reed − acoustic lead guitar on "Guitar Man" and "Big Boss Man"
 Charlie McCoy − organ, harmonica
 Floyd Cramer − piano, organ
Hoyt Hawkins − piano, organ
 Bob Moore − double bass
 D. J. Fontana − drums
 Buddy Harman − drums

Charts

References

External links

LPM-3893 Clambake Guide part of The Elvis Presley Record Research Database
LSP-3893 Clambake Guide part of The Elvis Presley Record Research Database

1967 soundtrack albums
Elvis Presley soundtracks
RCA Records soundtracks
Albums produced by Jeff Alexander
Albums produced by Felton Jarvis
Musical film soundtracks